Eupithecia spadiceata is a moth in the family Geometridae first described by Hans Zerny in 1933. It is found in the Near East (including Armenia), Italy, Hungary, Ukraine and Russia.

References

Moths described in 1933
spadiceata
Moths of Europe
Moths of Asia